Stephensia staudingeri is a moth of the family Elachistidae. It is found on the  island of Rhodes in Greece.

The larvae feed on Origanum. They mine the leaves of their host plant. The mine starts as a small corridor, which is entirely filled with frass. Later, the mine becomes a full depth blotch with dispersed frass. The larva may vacate the mine and restart elsewhere. Pupation takes place outside of the mine in a dense spinning under a folded leaf margin. Larvae can be found from early June to early July. They are colourless and without markings.

References

Moths described in 1981
Elachistidae
Moths of Europe